Frank J. Thomas may refer to:
 Frank Thomas (outfielder) (Frank Joseph Thomas), American baseball player
 Frank J. Thomas (printer), American photographer, typographer, and printer

See also
 Frank Thomas (disambiguation)